Interdisciplinary Centre for Mathematical and Computational Modelling (ICM) is a supercomputing and research data centre at the University of Warsaw in Poland.

See also
 Open access in Poland

References

Organizations established in 1993
University of Warsaw
Supercomputer sites